Kanfer is a surname. Notable people with the surname include:

Michael Kanfer, American visual effects artist
Ruth Kanfer (born 1955), American psychologist and professor
Stefan Kanfer (1933–2018), American journalist, critic, editor, and author

See also
Kanner
Kanter